Consuelo Berlanga (born 18 February 1955), is a Spanish journalist.

Early life 
Berlanga was born in Aguilar de la Frontera, Córdoba, Spain.

Career 
Berlanga's professional career has primarily been in television, though she has also done notable work in radio.

After that show was canceled, she was signed by Chicho Ibáñez Serrador to present the game show , which she did from 1989 to 1991.

Berlanga later moved to Antena 3 where she hosted the daily magazine  (1991–1992), followed by the game show  (1992), the musical Quédate con la copla (1992), and the children's show Cámara baja (1993). At the same time, she took advantage of the opportunity to work in radio, on the show Somos como somos (1993) on Antena 3 Radio.

Once her relationship with the private network ended, Berlanga moved to Seville, and for many years her professional development was linked to the Andalusian autonomous channel Canal Sur, where she presented the nostalgic Qué pasó con and Senderos de Gloria, a program created to pay homage to the anonymous faces of Andalusian life.

Berlanga was one of the contestants on the 2010 season of Survivor Spain. She was the first to be voted off, lasting seven days. At the end of that year she began to contribute to the series  on Telecinco, hosted by María Teresa Campos, where she remained until 2014.

Television career
  (1987–1989) on Televisión Española – Contributor
  (1989–1991) on Televisión Española – Presenter
  (1991–1992) on Antena 3 – Presenter and director
 Campanadas Fin de Año (1991) on Antena 3 – Presenter
  (1992) on Antena 3 – Presenter
 Quédate con la Copla (1992) on Antena 3 – Presenter
 Cámara Baja (1993) on Antena 3 – Presenter
 Qué pasó con (1995–1996) on Canal Sur and Telemadrid – Presenter
 Por qué (1997) on Canal Sur – Presenter
 Canciones para el recuerdo (1997–1998) on Canal Sur – Presenter
 Senderos de Gloria (1999–2003) on Canal Sur – Presenter
 Gala de Andalucia (2003) on Canal Sur – Presenter
 Punto y Medio Verano (2006) on Canal Sur– Presenter
 El punto Berlanga (2004–2009) on  – Presenter 
 Survivor Spain (2010) on Telecinco – Contestant
  (2010–2014) on Telecinco – Contributor
 Gran Hermano VIP (2017) on Telecinco – Contributor
 Sábado Deluxe (2017) on Telecinco – Contributor

Awards
 Antena de Oro Award – Television (1993)

References

External links
 

1955 births
Living people
People from Campiña Sur (Córdoba)
Spanish game show hosts
Spanish journalists
Spanish women journalists
Spanish radio presenters
Spanish women radio presenters